Anita Björk (25 April 1923 – 24 October 2012) was a Swedish actress.

She was born in Tällberg, Dalarna and attended the Royal Dramatic Training Academy from 1942 to 1945. She was a leading lady of Swedish theatre for many years and worked on the national stage Dramaten from 1945 onwards and played more than 100 roles over the years (which makes her one of the greatest actors of Dramaten).

Anita Björk played leading roles in film in a number of genres, including thrillers and crime mystery dramas such as Det kom en gäst (1947), Moln över Hellesta (1956), Damen i svart (1958), Mannekäng i rött (1958) and Tärningen är kastad (1960). Her most famous role was probably her title role in Alf Sjöberg's film adaption of Strindberg's Miss Julie (1951) that was awarded the grand prize at Cannes Film Festival.

In the book-length interview Hitchcock/Truffaut (Simon and Schuster, 1967), Hitchcock said he had hired Björk as the female lead for I Confess in 1952 after seeing her in Miss Julie. However, when Björk arrived in Hollywood with her lover Stig Dagerman and their baby, Jack L. Warner, the head of Warner Brothers insisted that Hitchcock should find another actress.

She was married to Olof Bergström (1945–1951) and to Stig Dagerman (from 1953). After Dagerman's death in 1954, she had a relationship with author Graham Greene.

In 2009 she performed in A. R. Gurney's play Kärleksbrev (Love Letters) at Dramaten opposite Jan-Olof Strandberg (Lilla scenen; March–April, 2009).

Björk died on 24 October 2012 at the age of 89.

Partial filmography

1942: Himlaspelet (a.k.a. The Heavenly Play / The Road to Heaven) – Anna Jesper
1944: Count Only the Happy Moments – Lilian Lind
1946: 100 dragspel och en flicka – Elsa Borell
1947: No Way Back – Evelyn
1947: Kvinna utan ansikte (a.k.a. Woman Without a Face) – Frida Grande
1947: Det kom en gäst – Siv
1948: On These Shoulders – Birgit Larsson
1949: Realm of Man – Birgit Maria Larsson
1950: The Quartet That Split Up  – Maj Andersson
1951: Fröken Julie (a.k.a. Miss Julie) – Miss Julie
1952: Kvinnors väntan (a.k.a. Secrets of Women) – Rakel
1952: Han glömde henne aldrig – Karin Engström
1954: Night People – 'Hoffy' Hoffmeier
1954: The Witch
1955: Getting Married (a.k.a. Of Love and Lust) – Helene
1955: Hamlet (TV Movie) – Ofelia, hans dotter
1955: The Cornet – Gräfin von Zathmar
1956: Moln över Hellesta (a.k.a. Moon Over Hellesta) – Margareta Snellman
1956: The Song of the Scarlet Flower – Kyllikki Malm
1957: A Guest in His Own House – Eva Dahl
1958: Damen i svart (a.k.a. The Lady in Black) – Inger von Schilden
1958: Körkarlen (a.k.a. The Phantom Carriage) – Mrs. Holm
1958: Mannekäng i rött (a.k.a. Mannequin in Red) – Birgitta Lindell
1960: The Die Is Cast – Rebecca Striid
1960: Good Friends and Faithful Neighbours – Mrs. Yvonne Frejer
1961: Square of Violence – Sophia
1962: The Lady in White – Helen G:son Lundberg
1963: Misantropen (TV Movie) – Célimène
1964: Älskande par (a.k.a. Loving Couples) – Petra von Pahlen
1966: Utro
1967: Tofflan – Erna Alm
1968: Komedi i Hägerskog – Narcissa
1969: Ådalen 31 (a.k.a. Adalen 31 / Adalen Riots) – Hedvig, Annas mor
1978: Tribadernas natt (TV Movie) – Siri von Essen
1979: Arven – Märta Skaug
1981: The Witch Hunt – Ingeborg Eriksdotter Jaatun
1986: Amorosa – Arvida
1989: Flickan vid stenbänken (TV Series) – Amalia
1992: Markisinnan de Sade (TV Movie, Ingmar Bergman) – Madame de Montreuil
1992: Den goda viljan (a.k.a. Best Intentions) (script: Ingmar Bergman) – Drottning Victoria
1993: Snoken (TV Series) – Harriet Lindholm
1996: Enskilda samtal (a.k.a. Private Confessions / Conversations) (TV Movie; Ingmar Bergman) – Karin Åkerblom
1997: Larmar och gör sig till (a.k.a. In the Presence of a Clown) (TV Movie, Ingmar Bergman) – Anna Åkerblom
1998: Sanna ögonblick – Karin
2000: Bildmakarna (a.k.a. The Image Makers) (TV Movie, Ingmar Bergman) – Selma Lagerlöf (final film role)

References

Further reading

External links

1923 births
2012 deaths
People from Leksand Municipality
Swedish stage actresses
Swedish film actresses
Eugene O'Neill Award winners